Gabriela Leyva Olvera (born ) is a Mexican female volleyball player.

She participated in the 2014 FIVB Volleyball World Grand Prix. She is part of the Mexico women's national volleyball team.

References

External links
 Profile at FIVB.org

1994 births
Living people
Mexican women's volleyball players
Place of birth missing (living people)